Suti Assembly constituency is an assembly constituency in Murshidabad district in the Indian state of West Bengal.

Overview
As per orders of the Delimitation Commission, No. 57 Suti Assembly constituency covers Suti II community development block and Bahutali, Harua and Sadikpur gram panchayats of Suti I community development block.

Suti Assembly constituency is part of No. 9 Jangipur (Lok Sabha constituency).

Members of Legislative Assembly

Election results

2011
In the 2011 election, Emani Biswas of Congress defeated his nearest rival Jane Alam Mian of RSP.

1977–2006
In the 2006 and 2001 state assembly elections Jane Alam Mian of RSP  won the Suti assembly seat defeating his nearest rival Md. Sohrab of Congress/ Independent. Contests in most years were multi cornered but only winners and runners are being mentioned. Md. Sohrab of Congress defeated Shish Mohammad of RSP in 1996. Shish Mohammad of RSP defeated Chitta Mookherjee of BJP in 1991, Rand Md. Sohrab of Congress in 1987 and 1982. Md. Sohrab of Congress defeated Shish Mohammad of RSP in 1977.

1951–1972
Shish Mohammad of RSP won in 1972. Md. Sohrab of Congress won in 1971 and 1969. S. Mahammad, Independent, won in 1967.Lutfal Haque of Congress/ Independent won in 1962,1957 and in independent India's first election in 1951.

References

Assembly constituencies of West Bengal
Politics of Murshidabad district